Kassettenliebe is a 1981 Swiss comedy film directed by Rolf Lyssy and starring Emil Steinberger, Franziska Oehme and Hilde Ziegler. A matrimonial agency is thrown into chaos when it adopts a new electronic system.

Cast
 Emil Steinberger – Felix Stamm
 Franziska Oehme – Regula Koller
 Hilde Ziegler – Kundin
 Christina Amun – Miss Schildknecht
 Michael Gempart – Sicherheitsbeamter
 Buddy Elias – Doctor Wicki
 Wolfram Berger – Taxifahrer

References

External links

1981 films
1981 comedy films
Swiss German-language films
Films directed by Rolf Lyssy
Swiss comedy films
1980s German-language films